Faysal Shayesteh (born 10 June 1991) is an Afghan professional footballer who plays as an attacking midfielder for I-League club Sreenidi Deccan and the Afghanistan national team.

Youth career 
Born in Kabul, Shayesteh moved to the Netherlands and played in the youth academy of FC Twente, until he signed with Heerenveen in 2010.

Club career

Heerenveen 
Shayesteh, 18-years old then, joined Heerenveen in the summer of 2010. He signed a contract until the summer of 2012.

Etar 
In February 2013, Shayesteh joined Bulgarian A PFG club Etar 1924. On 2 March, he made his league debut in a 2–1 home win over Montana, coming on as a substitute in the 88th minute.

Songkhla United 
In October 2013, Shayesteh made a transfer move to Thailand football club Songkhla United after his contract expired with Etar. He was given shirt number 10. He left Songkhla after they relegated in 2015.

Pahang 
In July 2016, Shayesteh announced on Facebook that he joined Pahang. It was also announced that he will play with shirt number 10. After just 6 months he resigned with Pahang.

Paykan 
In January 2017, Shayesteh signed a one-and a-half-year contract with Paykan F.C. to becoming the first ever Afghan professional footballer in the Persian Gulf Pro League.

Gokulam Kerala 
On 19 November 2017, Shayesteh moved to I-League and signed with Gokulam Kerala for a season, but appeared in a single match for the side.

Lampang 
In June 2018, he moved to Thailand and signed with Thai League 2 side Lampang.

VV DUNO 
In 2020, Shayesteh moved back to the Nederlands and joined VV DUNO in the Hoofdklasse.

Sreenidi Deccan
In August 2022, I-League side Sreenidi Deccan announced the signing of Shayesteh for the 2022–23 season.

International career 
On 13 April 2014, Shayesteh made his debut for the national team of Afghanistan in a friendly match against Kyrgyzstan. He played as left fullback. In the 17th minute of the match he missed a penalty. On 14 May 2014, Afghanistan played a friendly match against Kuwait. Shayesteh scored a beautiful free-kick at the game.

On 22 May 2014, Shayesteh scored his first goal with a free-kick from nearly 50 meters against Turkmenistan in the 2014 AFC Challenge Cup. After Djelaludin Sharityar retired Shayesteh became the new captain of the national team. He led the team into the final of the 2015 SAFF Championship in Tiruvanantapuram, which was the country's last participation. He scored three goals in that competition but finished as runners-up, as Afghanistan lost 1–2 to India. In April 2016, he was named as Afghanistan's Athlete of the year 2015.

Personal life 
He is the younger brother of Qays Shayesteh, who also plays football and represented Afghanistan national team from 2011 to 2017.

Career statistics

Club 

Scores and results list Afghanistan's goal tally first, score column indicates score after each Shayesteh goal.

Honours 
Afghanistan
 SAFF Championship: runner-up 2015

Individual
 Afghanistan's Athlete of the Year: 2015

References

External links 

Profile at Sportal
profile and statistics at footballcritic

1991 births
Living people
Afghan emigrants to the Netherlands
Afghan footballers
Dutch footballers
Footballers from Kabul
Association football midfielders
Afghanistan international footballers
Asian Games competitors for Afghanistan
Footballers at the 2014 Asian Games
First Professional Football League (Bulgaria) players
Faysal Shayesteh
Persian Gulf Pro League players
I-League players
FC Etar 1924 Veliko Tarnovo players
Faysal Shayesteh
Sri Pahang FC players
Paykan F.C. players
Gokulam Kerala FC players
Faysal Shayesteh
Faysal Shayesteh
VV DUNO players
Afghan expatriate footballers
Afghan expatriate sportspeople in the Netherlands
Expatriate footballers in the Netherlands
Afghan expatriate sportspeople in Bulgaria
Expatriate footballers in Bulgaria
Afghan expatriate sportspeople in Thailand
Expatriate footballers in Thailand
Afghan expatriate sportspeople in Malaysia
Expatriate footballers in Malaysia
Afghan expatriate sportspeople in Iran
Expatriate footballers in Iran
Afghan expatriate sportspeople in India
Expatriate footballers in India
Sreenidi Deccan FC players